Monsoon Drift is an abstract steel sculpture, by Anthony Caro.

It is in the Hirshhorn Museum and Sculpture Garden.

In 1973, he salvaged rolled steel material, at the Consett steel mills, County Durham.

See also
 List of public art in Washington, D.C., Ward 2

References

External links
 http://virtualglobetrotting.com/map/monsoon-drift-by-anthony-caro/

Outdoor sculptures in Washington, D.C.
1975 sculptures
Steel sculptures in Washington, D.C.
Hirshhorn Museum and Sculpture Garden
Sculptures of the Smithsonian Institution